Will Murray may refer to:

Will Murray, American author
Will Murray, Canadian defense lawyer and candidate in the 2007 Ontario provincial election
Will Murray, segment producer and member of the Howard Stern Show staff

See also
William Murray (disambiguation)